The Patliputra–Chandigarh Superfast Express is an Superfast Express train belonging to East Central Railway zone that runs between Chandigarh Junction and Patliputra Junction in India. It is currently being operated with 22355/22356 train numbers on a biweekly basis.

Service

The 22355/Patliputra–Chandigarh Express has an average speed of 55 km/hr and covers 1153 km in 20hr 50mins. The 22356/Chandigarh - Patliputra Express covers the same distance at an average speed of 55 km/hr but in 21hr.

Route and halts 

It commences its journey from the Patliputra Junction railway station  and travels through the Indian states of Bihar, Uttar Pradesh, Uttrakhand, Haryana and Punjab to reach Chandigarh.

The important halts of the train are:

 
 
 
 
 
 
 
 
 
 Hardoi

Coach composite

The train has standard LHB rakes with max speed of 130 kmph. The train consists of 22 coaches :

 1 AC I Tier Coach
 2 AC II Tier Coaches
 6 AC III Tier Coaches
 6 Sleeper Coaches
 1 Pantry Car Coach
 5 General Coaches
 1 Luggage Brake and Generator Car

Traction

Both trains are hauled by a Mughal Sarai Loco Shed based WAP-4 electric locomotive from Patna to Chandigarh and vice versa.

News

The train was selected under the 2nd phase of project Utkrisht by East Central Railway to boost the comfort level for the passengers.
But now LHBfied for extreme comfort for the passengers.

See also 

 Chandigarh Junction railway station
 Patliputra Junction railway station
 Akal Takht Express
 Gurumukhi Superfast Express 
 Dibrugarh-Chandigarh Express
 Saharsa - Amritsar Jan Sadharan Express (via Chandigarh)

Notes

External links 

 22355/Patliputra - Chandigarh Express
 22356/Chandigarh - Patliputra Express

References 

Transport in Patna
Express trains in India
Rail transport in Haryana
Rail transport in Chandigarh
Rail transport in Bihar
Rail transport in Uttar Pradesh
Railway services introduced in 2013